Warren Alfred Schrage (July 30, 1920 – January 19, 1999) was an American professional basketball player. He played for the Sheboygan Red Skins in the National Basketball League in 1942–43 and averaged 0.2 points per game. 

Schrage won national championships in both college (Wisconsin, 1941) and professionally (Sheboygan Red Skins, 1943).

References

1920 births
1999 deaths
American men's basketball players
Basketball players from Wisconsin
Centers (basketball)
Forwards (basketball)
People from Plymouth, Wisconsin
Sheboygan Red Skins players
Wisconsin Badgers men's basketball players